Reggie Redbird is the mascot for Illinois State University located in Normal, Illinois. Reggie is present at all home football games, women's volleyball matches, men's basketball games, women's basketball games, and appears at various other athletic events. Reggie also does numerous of appearances at schools and events within the Twin Cities, the state of Illinois, and the country.

Reggie Redbird is a student bedecked in costume. Reggie was named in 1980 after a contest among Junior Redbird Club Members.
The first suit was donated by Rick Percy, general manager of Clemens and Associates Insurance and a longtime member of The Redbird Club.

History
The nickname "Redbirds" for the sports teams (replacing the unofficial mascot "Pedagogs" or "Fighting Teachers") was adopted by the then Illinois State Normal University in 1923 by the athletic director Clifford E. "Pop" Horton, with an assist from The Daily Pantagraph sports editor Fred Young.

Horton liked "Cardinals" because the school colors, established in 1894–95, were cardinal and white, and the University teams were known by that nickname for a short period of time. Young recommended the change to "Red birds" to avoid confusion in the headlines with the St. Louis Cardinals baseball team, the two names were joined to "Redbirds" by the 1930's.

The mascot is named after MLB Hall of Fame Reggie Jackson, who has no connection to the university or the state of Illinois.

References

External links
ISU full explanation of "Redbirds"

Illinois State University
College mascots in the United States